Kopance is a village in the municipality of Jegunovce, North Macedonia.

Demographics
As of the 2021 census, Kopance had 844 residents with the following ethnic composition:
Albanians 548
Macedonians 196
Persons for whom data are taken from administrative sources 100

According to the 2002 census, the village had a total of 1,059 inhabitants. Ethnic groups in the village include:

Albanians 752
Macedonians 300
Serbs 4
Others 3

References

External links

Villages in Jegunovce Municipality
Albanian communities in North Macedonia